Olveston is a small village and parish in Gloucestershire, England, UK.

Olveston may also refer to:
Olveston (house), a stately home in New Zealand
Olveston, Montserrat, a suburb of Salem on the island of Montserrat
Olveston House, a large home once inhabited by Beatles producer George Martin, now a guest house, in Salem, Montserrat